Muki (Quechua for asphyxia, also for a goblin who lives in caves, also spelled Muqui) is a mountain in the Cordillera Central in the Andes of Peru which reaches a height of approximately . It is located in the Lima Region, Yauyos Province, on the border of the districts of Huancaya and Tomas.

References 

Mountains of Peru
Mountains of Lima Region